Great House is a historic home located at St. Augustine, Cecil County, Maryland, United States. It is a large two story brick dwelling constructed in the second quarter of the 18th century. The house retains virtually all its original interior detailing and hardware.

Great House was listed on the National Register of Historic Places in 1984.

References

External links
 , including photo from 1968, Maryland Historical Trust
 Great House Plantation, Mitton Road, Saint Augustine, Cecil, MD at the Historic American Buildings Survey (HABS)

Houses on the National Register of Historic Places in Maryland
Houses in Cecil County, Maryland
Historic American Buildings Survey in Maryland
National Register of Historic Places in Cecil County, Maryland